Benue may refer to:
 Benue River, a river in Cameroon and Nigeria
 Benue State, a state in Nigeria
 Benue-Plateau State, a former administrative division in Nigeria
 Benue Trough, a major geological formation in Nigeria
 Benue–Congo languages, a major language group in Africa
  a Hansa A type cargo ship in service 1944-45